Grand Mosque of West Sumatra is a mosque in Padang, West Sumatra, Indonesia. It is the largest mosque in West Sumatra, and the second largest mosque in Sumatra. It is located in Padang Utara Subdistrict, Padang, West Sumatra. The Grand Mosque of West Sumatra is located within a complex of 40,345 square meter on the intersection of Jalan Khatib Sulaiman and Jalan Ahmad Dahlan.

Construction
The first stone of the construction was laid on December 21, 2007, inaugurated by the Governor of West Sumatra Province Gamawan Fauzi. 

Construction took a long time because of budget issues. Apart from relying on the West Sumatra's regional government budget, other strategies were used to collect funding, such as relying on donation from the people, from the private sectors, as well as from foreign governments. In 2009 The government of Saudi Arabia funded 50 million US dollars for the construction of the mosque, however this came at the same time as the 2009 West Sumatra earthquakes, so the funding was relocated for rehabilitation of the earthquake victims and reconstruction process of West Sumatra instead. In 2014, the Turkish government donated rugs for the mosque. 

Prayers were held in the mosque for the first time on February 7, 2014.

Architecture
The mosque was designed by local architect Rizal Muslimin, selected as the winner of the 2007 competition for a new mosque in West Sumatra. The competition had 323 participants from around the world. 

The most distinctive feature of the mosque is its roof form, a contemporary interpretation of the traditional roof of the Minangkabau vernacular houses. The shape of the roof is also meant to symbolize the cloth that was held by its corners by the four clan leaders of the Quraysh tribe to lift the Black Stone to the current spot in Mecca. The roof frame is constructed of steel pipes, supported by four curving concrete columns. 

The main building consists of three floors. The main prayer hall is located on the second floor. The mosque is able to accommodate 20,000 people.

See also

Rumah Gadang
Indonesian mosques
List of mosques in Indonesia

References

Works cited

Mosques in Padang